Moers (older form: Mörs; archaic Dutch: Murse, Murs or Meurs) is a German city on the western bank of the Rhine, close to Duisburg. Moers belongs to the district of Wesel.

History

Known earliest from 1186, the county of Moers was an independent principality within the Holy Roman Empire.

During the Eighty Years' War it was alternately captured by Spanish and Dutch troops, as it bordered the Upper Quarter of Guelders. During the war it finally fell to Maurice of Orange. As it was separated from the Dutch Republic by Spanish Upper Guelders it did not become an integral part of the Republic, though Dutch troops were stationed there.

After the death of William III of Orange in 1702, Moers was inherited by the king of Prussia. All Dutch troops and civil servants were expelled.

In 1795 it was annexed by France. At the Congress of Vienna, in 1815 it was returned to Prussia and in 1871 it became part of the German Empire.

A target of the Oil Campaign of World War II, the Steinkohlenbergwerke Rheinpreussen synthetic oil plant in Moers, was partially dismantled post-war.

Mayors

1815–1820: Wilhelm Urbach
1822–1830: von Nievenheim
1830–1850: Friedrich Adolf Vinmann
1850–1859: Karl von Strampff
1860–1864: Gottlieb Meumann
1864–1897: Gustav Kautz
1898–1910: August Craemer
1910–1915: Richard Glum
1917–1937: Fritz Eckert
1937–1941: Fritz Grüttgen
1943–1945: Peter Linden
1945–1946: Otto Maiweg
1946: Karl Peschken
1946–1952: Wilhelm Müller
1952–1977: Albin Neuse (SPD)
1977–1999: Wilhelm Brunswick (SPD)
1999–2004: Rafael Hofmann (CDU)
2004–2014: Norbert Ballhaus (SPD)
2014–: Christoph Fleischhauer (CDU)

Sports
In 1985, the Moers Sports Club (volleyball) was formed, winning the 1989 Bundesliga championship.

Notable people

Gerhard Tersteegen (1697–1769), lay preacher, mystic and poet
Georg Perthes (1869–1927), surgeon and radiologist (Perthes disease)
Anna Erler-Schnaudt (1878–1963), contralto
Hans Dammers (1913–1944), Luftwaffe ace
Walter Niephaus (1923–1992), chess master
Hanns Dieter Hüsch (1925–2005), comedian, writer
Hubert Hahne (1935–2019), race car driver
Herman Weigel (born 1950), film producer and screenwriter
Jürgen Renn (born 1956), physicist and historian of science
Helga Trüpel (born 1958), politician (Alliance 90/The Greens)
Jörg van Ommen (born 1962), race car driver
Katja Nass (born 1968), fencer
Stephan Paßlack (born 1970), footballer
Christian Ehrhoff (born 1982), ice hockey player
Timo Weß (born 1982), field hockey player
Benjamin Weß (born 1985), field hockey player
Regina Abelt (born 1954), first First Lady of Ethiopia (1995–2001)

Politics

Mayor
The current mayor of Moers is Christoph Fleischhauer of the Christian Democratic Union (CDU). The most recent mayoral election was held on 13 September 2020, with a runoff held on 27 September, and the results were as follows:

! rowspan=2 colspan=2| Candidate
! rowspan=2| Party
! colspan=2| First round
! colspan=2| Second round
|-
! Votes
! %
! Votes
! %
|-
| bgcolor=| 
| align=left| Christoph Fleischhauer
| align=left| Christian Democratic Union
| 15,313
| 38.4
| 17,457
| 57.9
|-
| bgcolor=| 
| align=left| Ibrahim Yetim
| align=left| Social Democratic Party
| 12,208
| 30.6
| 12,679
| 42.1
|-
| bgcolor=| 
| align=left| Diana Finkele
| align=left| Alliance 90/The Greens
| 4,534
| 11.4
|-
| bgcolor=| 
| align=left| Torsten Gerlach
| align=left| Independent
| 4,350
| 10.9
|-
| 
| align=left| Claus Küster
| align=left| Die Grafschafter
| 1,518
| 3.8
|-
| bgcolor=| 
| align=left| Dino Maas
| align=left| Free Democratic Party
| 1,238
| 3.1
|-
| bgcolor=| 
| align=left| Markus Helmich
| align=left| Independent
| 706
| 1.8
|-
! colspan=3| Valid votes
! 39,867
! 98.6
! 30,136
! 99.3
|-
! colspan=3| Invalid votes
! 553
! 1.4
! 214
! 0.7
|-
! colspan=3| Total
! 40,420
! 100.0
! 30,350
! 100.0
|-
! colspan=3| Electorate/voter turnout
! 80,950
! 49.9
! 80,906
! 37.5
|-
| colspan=7| Source: City of Moers (1st round, 2nd round)
|}

City council

The Moers city council governs the city alongside the Mayor. The most recent city council election was held on 13 September 2020, and the results were as follows:

! colspan=2| Party
! Votes
! %
! +/-
! Seats
! +/-
|-
| bgcolor=| 
| align=left| Christian Democratic Union (CDU)
| 12,431
| 31.3
|  3.2
| 17
|  2
|-
| bgcolor=| 
| align=left| Social Democratic Party (SPD)
| 11,593
| 29.2
|  8.5
| 16
|  4
|-
| bgcolor=| 
| align=left| Alliance 90/The Greens (Grüne)
| 6,563
| 16.5
|  7.5
| 9
|  4
|-
| bgcolor=| 
| align=left| Alternative for Germany (AfD)
| 2,548
| 6.4
| New
| 3
| New
|-
| bgcolor=| 
| align=left| Free Democratic Party (FDP)
| 1,860
| 4.7
|  0.3
| 2
|  1
|-
| 
| align=left| Die Grafschafter (Graf)
| 1,544
| 3.9
|  2.9
| 2
|  2
|-
| bgcolor=| 
| align=left| Die PARTEI
| 1,302
| 3.3
| New
| 2
| New
|-
| bgcolor=| 
| align=left| The Left (Die Linke)
| 1,125
| 2.8
|  3.5
| 2
|  1
|-
|  
| align=left| Free Citizens' List Moers (FBM)
| 733
| 1.9
| New
| 1
| New
|-
! colspan=2| Valid votes
! 39,699
! 98.2
! 
! 
! 
|-
! colspan=2| Invalid votes
! 710
! 1.8
! 
! 
! 
|-
! colspan=2| Total
! 40,409
! 100.0
! 
! 54
! ±0
|-
! colspan=2| Electorate/voter turnout
! 80,950
! 49.9
! 
! 
! 
|-
| colspan=7| Source: City of Moers
|}

Twin towns – sister cities

Moers is twinned with:

 Maisons-Alfort, France (1966)
 Bapaume, France (1974)
 Knowsley, England, United Kingdom (1980)
 Ramla, Israel (1987)
 La Trinidad, Nicaragua (1989)
 Seelow, Germany (1990)
 Stazzema, Italy (2019)

See also
Moers Festival
Burma-Shave, which awarded a trip to Moers in a 1955 promotion

References

External links

 
Tourism and culture. Personal guide to the city of Moers

 
Cities in North Rhine-Westphalia
Oil campaign of World War II
Populated places on the Rhine
Wesel (district)
Districts of the Rhine Province